Hadromerella is a genus of flies in the family Dolichopodidae. It contains two species known from Java in Indonesia.

Species
 Hadromerella antennata Hollis, 1964
 Hadromerella setosa Meijere, 1916

References 

Dolichopodidae genera
Peloropeodinae
Diptera of Asia
Insects of Java
Endemic fauna of Java